Dutchman Peak is a summit in the U.S. state of Oregon.

The word "Dutchman" does not refer to the Dutch people or Dutch language, but to the original German settlers.

References

Mountains of Jackson County, Oregon
Mountains of Oregon